Bellevue is an unincorporated community in Calcasieu Parish, Louisiana, United States.

Notes

Unincorporated communities in Calcasieu Parish, Louisiana
Unincorporated communities in Louisiana